Mert Atlı (born 23 July 1993 in Balıkesir, Turkey) is a Turkish racewalker. He is a member of Ayvalık Atletizm SK.

He earned a quota spot for 2016 Summer Olympics with his performance of placing 6th in the 20 km race walk event at the IAAF Race Walking Challenge in Dudince, Slovakia.

References

1993 births
Sportspeople from Balıkesir
Turkish male racewalkers
Living people
Athletes (track and field) at the 2016 Summer Olympics
Olympic athletes of Turkey
21st-century Turkish people